Trochoidea caroni  is a species of air-breathing land snail, a terrestrial pulmonate gastropod mollusk in the family Geomitridae, the hairy snails and their allies.

Distribution

This species is endemic to Italy.

References

  Deshayes, G. P. (1830-1832). Encyclopédie méthodique ou par ordre de matières. Histoire naturelle des Vers et Mollusques. Vol. 2: viii+1-594
 Bank, R. A.; Neubert, E. (2017). Checklist of the land and freshwater Gastropoda of Europe. Last update: July 16th, 2017

External links
  Deshayes, G. P. (1830-1832). Encyclopédie méthodique ou par ordre de matières. Histoire naturelle des Vers et Mollusques. Vol. 2: viii+1-594
 Nicola Maio1* Agnese Petraccioli, Paolo Crovato, Nabil Amor & Gaetano Odierna1 - New faunistic data on Trochoidea (Trochoidea) caroni (Deshayes, 1832) (Gastropoda Pulmonata Hygromiidae);Biodiversity Journal, 2013, 4 (4): 483-500

Trochoidea (genus)
Molluscs of Europe
Endemic fauna of Italy
Gastropods described in 1832